Behestan may refer to:
 Behestan, Ardabil
 Behestan, West Azerbaijan
 Behestan, Zanjan